Konomi Uchida (born 20 July 1995) is a Japanese professional footballer who plays as a defender for WE League club Sanfrecce Hiroshima Regina.

Club career 
Uchida made her WE League debut on 20 November 2021.

References 

Living people
1995 births
Japanese women's footballers
Women's association football defenders
Association football people from Okayama Prefecture
Sanfrecce Hiroshima Regina players
WE League players